Sandhya Shantaram (née Vijaya Deshmukh) is an Indian actress born in 1938. She is best known for her appearances in various Hindi and Marathi films directed by her husband V. Shantaram, in 1950s-1960s, most notably Jhanak Jhanak Payal Baaje (1955), Do Aankhen Barah Haath (1958), Navrang (1959), Marathi film Pinjra (1972) and Amar Bhoopali (1951).

Career
Sandhya was discovered by V. Shantaram when he was seeking new faces to cast for his film Amar Bhoopali (1951). The young woman did not have outstanding features or talent, but what struck the filmmaker was that she had a good voice, one that strangely resembled that of his second wife, the actress Jayshree.  She later married him after Jayshree left him. In 1952, Sandhya debuted as an actress in his Marathi film Amar Bhoopali in the role of a vocalist, the object of poet Honaji Bala's desire. She went on to feature in most of Shantaram's films. In her next film Teen Batti Char Raasta (1953), she played an impoverished girl named Kokila who is considered unattractive because of her dark skin, but who is secretly a radio star with a beautiful singing voice. Like her name, she resembled the black bird koel which sings beautifully. For the role, Sandhya wore dark makeup.

As she had no formal dance training, she underwent intensive instruction in classical dance from co-star Gopi Krishna for the film Jhanak Jhanak Payal Baaje. The two play Kathak dancers who are preparing for an important competition, but face opposition from their dance guru when they fall in love. The film was very successful and went on to win four Filmfare Awards as well as the National Film Award for Best Feature Film in Hindi. Sandhya starred opposite her husband in the film Do Aankhen Barah Haath, where she played Champa, a toy seller who fascinates the warden and inmates as she walks outside their jail. In Navrang, she played the plain wife of the titular character, a poet, who creates a fantasy image of her as his beautiful and sensuous muse. The film contained the Holi song "Arre Ja Re Hatt Natkhat", where Sandhya dances with an elephant wearing dancing bells ghungroo.

She next starred in Stree (1961), a film version of Shakuntala's story from the Mahabharata. As the epic mentions that Shakuntala and her son Bharata lived in the wilderness among lions, Shantaram decided to include real lions in some scenes. Sandhya did not have a double for these scenes; she prepared by shadowing a lion tamer and practicing in the cage with the lions. Sandhya's last major role was in the Marathi version of Pinjra; her character is that of a tamasha artiste who falls in love with a school teacher out to reform her, played by Shriram Lagoo in his film debut.

In 2009, she made a special appearance at the V. Shantaram Awards ceremony to commemorate the 50th anniversary of Navrang.

Filmography 

1952 Amar Bhoopali
1952 Parchhain
1953 Teen Batti Char Raasta
1955 Jhanak Jhanak Payal Baaje
1958 Do Aankhen Barah Haath
1959 Navrang
1961 Stree
1963 Sehra
1966 Ladki Sahyadri Ki
1971 Jal Bin Machhli Nritya Bin Bijli
1972 Pinjra

References

External links

Indian film actresses
Living people
Actresses in Hindi cinema
Actresses in Marathi cinema
20th-century Indian actresses
Shantaram family
Year of birth uncertain
1938 births